Scott Nnaji is a Nigerian women's basketball coach. He coached the Nigeria women's national basketball team in a number of international tournaments, including the 2004 Summer Olympics as an assistant coach and multiple AfroBasket Women tournaments as head coach.

References

Living people
Nigerian women's basketball coaches
Nigerian Olympic coaches
Year of birth missing (living people)